Bolanthus is a genus of flowering plants belonging to the family Caryophyllaceae.

Its native range is Greece to Jordan.

Species:

Bolanthus aziz-sancarii 
Bolanthus cherlerioides 
Bolanthus confertifolius 
Bolanthus filicaulis 
Bolanthus frankenioides 
Bolanthus hirsutus 
Bolanthus huber-morathii 
Bolanthus mevlanae 
Bolanthus minuartioides 
Bolanthus ortegioides 
Bolanthus sandrasicus 
Bolanthus spergulifolius 
Bolanthus stenopetalus 
Bolanthus thymoides 
Bolanthus turcicus

References

Caryophyllaceae
Caryophyllaceae genera